The prime minister of Algeria is the head of government of Algeria. Aymen Benabderrahmane has been the prime minister since 30 June 2021.

The prime minister is appointed by the president of Algeria, along with other ministers and members of the government that the new prime minister recommends. The People's National Assembly must approve the legislative program of the new government or the Assembly is dissolved and the prime minister must resign.

There are no constitutional limits on a prime minister's term. The longest-serving prime minister was Mohamed Ben Ahmed Abdelghani, who served under President Chadli Bendjedid from 8 March 1979 until 22 January 1984. He served as the first prime minister since 1963, when the position was abolished.

Office

See also
Politics of Algeria
President of Algeria

References

 
Algeria, Prime Minister of
Politics of Algeria
Government of Algeria
Prime Minister
1962 establishments in Algeria